Ageless Venomous is the fourth album by Brazilian death metal band Krisiun.
The album cover artwork was done by Joe Petagno, the same artist who created Motörhead's War-Pig logo.

Track listing 
 All songs written, composed and arranged by Krisiun

Personnel 
 Alex Camargo – bass, vocals
 Moyses Kolesne – guitars; acoustic guitar in Diableros
 Max Kolesne – drums; percussion in Diableros

Production
 Produced by Krisiun and Tchelo Martins
 Engineered, mixed and mastered by Phillip Colodetti
 Joe Petagno – cover artwork

References 

Krisiun albums
Albums with cover art by Joe Petagno
2001 albums
Century Media Records albums